The Kurosawa Film Studio consists of three studios that were founded by the movie director Akira Kurosawa and are located in Japan.
 Yokohama Studio
 Tomei Kawasaki Studio
 Yokohama Kizai Center

The Yokohama Studio is located in Midori ward of Yokohama city in the Kirigaoka suburb.  It was completed on November 1, 1983.  One of the films produced in the studio is Akira Kurosawa's Dreams.

References

External links
  Kurosawa Film Studio

Japanese film studios
Mass media in Yokohama